The Mosquitia-Nicaraguan Caribbean Coast mangroves ecoregion, in the Mangrove biome, are along the Caribbean coasts of Nicaragua and Honduras as well as off shore islands such as the Corn Islands.

Description
The Mosquitia-Nicaraguan Caribbean Coast mangroves community includes a diverse number of mangrove species: red mangrove (Rhizophora mangle), black mangrove (Avicennia germinans), white mangrove (Laguncularia racemosa), buttonwood (Conocarpus erectus), and another species of red mangrove (Rhizophora harrisonii) as well as the occasional rare occurrences of piñuelo mangrove (Pelliciera rhizophorae).

References

Mangrove ecoregions
Ecoregions of Nicaragua
Ecoregions of Costa Rica
 Mangroves
Natural history of Nicaragua
Natural history of Costa Rica
Natural history of Honduras
 
 
 
Neotropical ecoregions